Nanette Konig-Blitz (born 6 April 1929) is a Bergen-Belsen concentration camp survivor and former classmate of Anne Frank. She has lived in São Paulo, Brazil since 1953. In 2015, she published a book about being a Belsen survivor called Eu Sobrevivi ao Holocausto. On Holocaust Memorial Day 26 January 2018, Nanette's book was published in English with the title Holocaust Memoirs of a Bergen-Belsen Survivor & Classmate of Anne Frank.

Biography
Nanette was born on 6 April 1929 in Amsterdam, to Martijn Willem Blitz, a worker at the Amsterdam Bank, and Helene Victoria Davids, who were of Jewish origin. She had an older brother, Bernard Martijn, born in 1927, and a younger brother, Willem, who was born in 1932 with a "blue baby" heart defect and died in 1936. The Nazis occupied the Netherlands in May 1940, and at the beginning of 1941, Jewish students were assigned to Jewish-designated schools; it was then that Nanette became a classmate of Anne Frank.

The Blitz family was arrested and taken to the Westerbork transit camp in September 1943. On 15 February 1944, they were deported to the Bergen-Belsen concentration camp.

Martijn died in late November of 1944. At the beginning of December 1944, Bernard and Helene were deported from Bergen-Belsen and Nanette remained alone. Bernard died in the Oranienburg concentration camp, while Helene was deported to the Beendorf salt mines as a slave labourer; she died in April 1945 on a train en route to Sweden.

In January 1945, Nanette was transferred to a part of Bergen-Belsen known as the "small women’s camp". From there, she saw Anne Frank in a "large field of women" through the barbed wired fence. These two camps become one section and it was then that Nanette was reunited with Anne and her sister Margot. 

Nanette survived Bergen-Belsen and was rescued by the British Major Leonard Berney. After the war, she spent three years in hospital due to typhus, the disease which killed Margot and Anne Frank. During this period, Anne's father visited her to ask about his daughters. Later, Otto Frank gave Nanette the diary written by his daughter Anne, Het Achterhuis (The Secret Annex). After Nanette had recovered, she went to live in England where she met her future husband, John Konig, who was of Hungarian origin. In 1953, they married and moved to Brazil. Nanette gave lectures about the Holocaust and her life. In 2018, her memoir Holocaust Memoirs of a Bergen-Belsen Survivor - Classmate of Anne Frank, a detailed account of her experiences during World War II, was published by Amsterdam Publishers. The book won the Readers' Favorite Gold Medal Award in 2019.

Bibliography

References

1929 births
Living people
Bergen-Belsen concentration camp survivors
Jewish concentration camp survivors
Women in World War II
Dutch emigrants to Brazil
People from Amsterdam
Anne Frank
Dutch Jews
Brazilian Jews
21st-century Dutch women writers